"My Heart Has a History" is a debut song co-written and recorded by Canadian country music artist Paul Brandt. Released in March 1996 as the first single from his debut album Calm Before the Storm, it peaked at #5 on the Hot Country Singles & Tracks (now Hot Country Songs) chart, while it was a Number One on the now-defunct RPM Canadian Singles Chart.  The song was written by Brandt and Mark D. Sanders.

Chart positions

Year-end charts

References

1996 debut singles
1996 songs
Paul Brandt songs
Songs written by Mark D. Sanders
Songs written by Paul Brandt
Song recordings produced by Josh Leo
Reprise Records singles
Canadian Country Music Association Song of the Year songs